Lichtenberg is the eleventh borough of Berlin, Germany. In Berlin's 2001 administrative reform it absorbed the former borough of Hohenschönhausen.

Overview
The district contains the Tierpark Berlin in Friedrichsfelde, the larger of Berlin's two zoological gardens. During the period of Berlin's partition between West and East, Lichtenberg was the location of the headquarters of the Stasi, the East German state security service. Prior to the establishment of the GDR it housed the main office of the Soviet Military Administration in Berlin, and before that it was an officers' mess of the Wehrmacht. The complex is now the location of the Stasi Museum. The Berlin-Hohenschönhausen Memorial is on the site of the main remand prison of the Stasi. Additionally, Lichtenberg is the location of the German-Russian Museum, the historical venue of the unconditional surrender of the German armed forces (Wehrmacht) on 8 May 1945.

Subdivision

Lichtenberg is divided into 10 localities:

History
The historic village of Lichtenberg together with neighbouring Friedrichsfelde, Karlshorst, Marzahn, Biesdorf, Hellersdorf, Kaulsdorf and Mahlsdorf was incorporated as the 17th borough of Berlin by the 1920 Greater Berlin Act.

In the 1970s, the East German government had large pre-fabricated high-rise housing estates (Plattenbau) built in the east of the Lichtenberg borough. This area was separated off and became the new borough of Marzahn, which included Biesdorf, Hellersdorf, Kaulsdorf and Mahlsdorf in 1979. In 1986, this district in turn was split into the two boroughs of Marzahn and Hellersdorf in 1986, and again merged as Marzahn-Hellersdorf by the 2001 administrative reform.

Politics

District council
The governing body of Lichtenberg is the district council (Bezirksverordnetenversammlung). It has responsibility for passing laws and electing the city government, including the mayor. The most recent district council election was held on 26 September 2021, and the results were as follows: 

! colspan=2| Party
! Lead candidate
! Votes
! %
! +/-
! Seats
! +/-
|-
| bgcolor=| 
| align=left| The Left (LINKE)
| align=left| Michael Grunst
| 36,283
| 24.8
|  5.0
| 15
|  3
|-
| bgcolor=| 
| align=left| Social Democratic Party (SPD)
| align=left| Jutta Feige
| 28,739
| 19.6
|  2.0
| 12
|  1
|-
| bgcolor=| 
| align=left| Christian Democratic Union (CDU)
| align=left| Martin Schaefer
| 19,224
| 13.1
|  0.5
| 8
|  1
|-
| bgcolor=| 
| align=left| Alliance 90/The Greens (Grüne)
| align=left| Daniela Ehlers
| 19,057
| 13.0
|  4.8
| 8
|  3
|-
| bgcolor=| 
| align=left| Alternative for Germany (AfD)
| align=left| Karsten Woldeit
| 17,528
| 12.0
|  7.2
| 7
|  5
|-
| bgcolor=| 
| align=left| Free Democratic Party (FDP)
| align=left| Rico Apitz
| 8,009
| 5.5
|  2.5
| 3
|  3
|-
| bgcolor=| 
| align=left| Tierschutzpartei
| align=left| Katja Michel
| 6,528
| 4.5
| New
| 2
| New
|-
| colspan=8 bgcolor=lightgrey|
|-
| bgcolor=| 
| align=left| Die PARTEI
| align=left| 
| 3,744
| 2.6
| New
| 0
| New
|-
| bgcolor=| 
| align=left| Free Voters
| align=left| 
| 3,214
| 2.2
| New
| 0
| New
|-
| bgcolor=| 
| align=left| dieBasis
| align=left| 
| 2,179
| 1.5
| New
| 0
| New
|-
| bgcolor=| 
| align=left| Pirate Party Germany
| align=left| 
| 1,124
| 0.8
|  2.1
| 0
| ±0
|-
| bgcolor=| 
| align=left| National Democratic Party
| align=left| 
| 433
| 0.3
|  0.7
| 0
| ±0
|-
| bgcolor=| 
| align=left| Liberal Conservative Reformers
| align=left| 
| 214
| 0.1
| New
| 0
| New
|-
! colspan=3| Valid votes
! 146,276
! 98.8
! 
! 
! 
|-
! colspan=3| Invalid votes
! 1,767
! 1.2
! 
! 
! 
|-
! colspan=3| Total
! 148,043
! 100.0
! 
! 55
! ±0
|-
! colspan=3| Electorate/voter turnout
! 216,202
! 68.5
!  8.4
! 
! 
|-
| colspan=8| Source: Elections Berlin
|}

District government
The district mayor (Bezirksbürgermeister) is elected by the Bezirksverordnetenversammlung, and positions in the district government (Bezirksamt) are apportioned based on party strength. Michael Grunst of the Left was elected mayor on 16 December 2016. Since the 2021 municipal elections, the composition of the district government is as follows:

Twin towns – sister cities

Lichtenberg is twinned with:

 Białołęka (Warsaw), Poland (2000)
 Hajnówka County, Poland (2001)
 Hoàn Kiếm (Hanoi), Vietnam (2015)
 Jurbarkas, Lithuania (2003)
 Kaliningrad Oblast, Russia (2001)
 KaMubukwana (Maputo), Mozambique (1995)
 Margareten (Vienna), Austria (2015)

People 
 Ilse Stöbe (1911–1942), German journalist and resistance fighter
 Hans Kempin (1913–1992), German Waffen-SS combat and training officer
 Bommi Baumann (born 1947), German construction worker, co-founder of the German organization Movement 2 June and author
 Gregor Gysi (born 1948), German politician (SED, The Linke)
 Katja Lange-Müller (born 1951), German writer
 Gesine Lötzsch (born 1961), German politician (SED, The Linke)
 Annett Fleischer (born 1979), German actress
 Alexander Fehling (born 1981), German actor
 Christoph Sydow (1985–2020), German journalist
 Daniel Siebert (born 1984), German football referee
 Patrick Hausding (born 1989), German diver

See also

Berlin-Lichtenberg (electoral district)

References

External links

 Official homepage
 Official homepage of Berlin
 Event- und Informationportal of Berlin Lichtenberg

 
Districts of Berlin
Former boroughs of Berlin

sv:Lichtenberg